Vuelve el ojo de vidrio (The Glass Eye Returns) is a 1970 Mexican revolution-epic film directed by René Cardona Jr., starring Antonio Aguilar, Flor Silvestre, Manuel Capetillo, Eleazar García, Alejandro Reyna, and Guillermo Rivas. It is the sequel to the film El ojo de vidrio.

Cast
Antonio Aguilar as Porfirio Alcalá y Buenavista "El Ojo de Vidrio"
Flor Silvestre as María "La Coralillo"
Manuel Capetillo as Gumaro Buenavista
Eleazar García as Chelelo Buenavista 
Alejandro Reyna as Plácido Buenavista 
Guillermo Rivas as Jerónimo Buenavista 
Arturo Martínez as Melitón Barbosa
Yuyú Varela as Socorro González "La Cocorito" 
Alfredo Varela, Jr. as Mr. Fregoli "Fregolini"
Eduardo Alcázar as Colonel
Emma Arvizu as Colonel's Wife
Jorge Cabrera		
Miguel Ángel Gómez	as Melitón's Friend
René Cardona Jr. as Mission Priest
Mario García "Harapos" as Carrancista Soldier
Fernando Durán Rojas (as Fernando Durán)
Juan Hernández		
Jesús Gómez as Carrancista Sentinel
Carlos Suárez		
Fídel Castañeda		
Salvador Aguilar		
Roberto Iglesias

External links

Mexican Revolution films
Mexican historical drama films
1970s Spanish-language films
1970s Mexican films